The Adidas Korea Cup 1998 was the ninth competition of the Korean League Cup, and one of two Korean League Cups held in 1998.

Group stage

Group A

Group B

Knockout stage

Bracket

Semi-finals

Final

Awards

Source:

See also
1998 in South Korean football
1998 Korean League Cup (Supplementary Cup)
1998 K League
1998 Korean FA Cup

References

External links
Official website
RSSSF

1998
1998
1998 domestic association football cups
1998 in South Korean football